Sirpur  is a village in Narayanpur tehsil, Bastar district, Chhattisgarh, India.

Demographics
In the 2001 India census, the village of Sirpur had a population of 235, with 111 males (47.2%) and 124 females (52.8%), for a gender ratio of 1117 females per thousand males.

References

Villages in Narayanpur district